Benoît Nicolas Musy (December 13, 1917 – October 7, 1956) was a Swiss Grand Prix motorcycle road racer and Maserati race car driver.

Biography 

Musy was born on December 13, 1917 in Bern, Switzerland, the son of the Swiss president Jean-Marie Musy.  He received an agriculture engineering degree from L'institut agricole de l'État de Fribourg in Grangeneuve / FR - Switzerland, and served in the air force during the Swiss military mobilisation World War II.  During 1944 he rescued a large number (1,200) of Jews from the concentration camp Theresienstadt with his father. He also received one of the first Swiss parachute jumper licenses in 1947.

Motorcycle racing 
He acquired further fame as a motorcycle racer, winning six Swiss championships with Moto Guzzi motorcycles. He also competed in the 1949 Swiss motorcycle Grand Prix, part of the inaugural Grand Prix motorcycle racing season. He competed in three more Swiss motorcycle Grand Prix races, finishing as high as fourth place.

Automobile racing 
Later he moved to racing cars. He had various ones, all Maserati. Musy started in May 1954, with a 1953 Maserati A6 or A6GCS (#2040), a Maserati factory race car, formerly used by Giletti, the official Maserati pilot. With this car he has won several races, including some record laps, on different tracks. He sold the car in 1955 to Pietro Pagliarini.

At that time, Musy was already part of the semi-official Maserati racing team. He took part of several races, with very little success, in a 150, 200S, and 200Si. He even participated at a race in Dakar in a 250; he failed to finish.

After a test drive in the Swedish Grand Prix, he bought a Maserati 300S (#3057) in 1955, with which he earned several podium results.

Musy died in a racing event at Autodrome de Montlhéry, France, on October 7, 1956, crashing a factory Maserati 200S (#2047) over an embankment, after a steering column breakdown. Ejected from the car, he died immediately.

In total, he attended eleven mid-1950s European sports car championships, of which he won five.

Auto racing results

References

External links 
Benoît Musy biography
Benoît Musy & Maserati racing
Benoît Musy biographie 
Enrico Maserati pages: Maserati 200
 History and pictures about B. Musy 
 Two different people from the same place: Jo Siffert and B. Musy 

1917 births
1956 deaths
People from Fribourg
Swiss motorcycle racers
250cc World Championship riders
500cc World Championship riders
Swiss racing drivers
Racing drivers who died while racing
Sport deaths in France
Sportspeople from the canton of Fribourg